Gösta Folke (10 December 1913 – 14 April 2008) was a Swedish actor, stage director and film director.  He was married to the actress  Agneta Prytz.

Selected filmography
 The Country Priest (1946)
 Kvinnor i väntrum (1946)
 Maria (1947)
 Neglected by His Wife (1947)
 On These Shoulders (1948)
 Realm of Man (1949)
 A Goat in the Garden (1958)
 A Lion in Town (1959)

References

Bibliography
 Goble, Alan. The Complete Index to Literary Sources in Film. Walter de Gruyter, 1999.
 Wright, Rochelle. The Visible Wall: Jews and Other Ethnic Outsiders in Swedish Film. SIU Press, 1998.

External links

1913 births
2008 deaths
Swedish film directors
Swedish male film actors
Swedish male stage actors
20th-century Swedish male actors
Swedish theatre directors
Swedish screenwriters
People from Stockholm
Male actors from Stockholm